Sayville is a hamlet and census-designated place in Suffolk County, New York, United States. Located on the South Shore of Long Island in the Town of Islip, the population of the CDP was 16,853 at the time of the 2010 census.

History
The earliest known inhabitants of Sayville were the Secatogue tribe of the Algonquian peoples.

Sayville was founded by John Edwards (b. 1738) of East Hampton, New York. He built his home, the first in Sayville, in 1761, located at what is now the northwest corner of Foster Avenue and Edwards Street. The house was destroyed by fire in March 1913. Another man, John Greene, settled what is now known as West Sayville in 1767.

The community had no formal name until 1838 when residents gathered to choose a name for their post office, which had opened on March 22, 1837.
Until that time, Sayville was known informally as "over south." The townspeople held a meeting to decide on a name, and after Edwardsville and Greensville tied in a vote, one resident suggested "Seaville". According to historical accounts, the clerk at that particular meeting did not know how to spell and had to go home and look in an old Bible he had brought from England years before. In the Bible, the word "sea" was spelled "s-a-y",
 and "Sayville" became the name he sent to Washington. After the error was discovered, the community sent a letter of protest to Washington D.C.; however, the Postmaster General responded
that the name should stay "Sayville", as there were many "Seaville"s in the world but no "Sayville"s. As a result, the name stuck. The claim is also sometimes made that "in some very old Bibles, the town name is also spelled 'S-a-v-i-l-l-e'"., It may be noted that until the early 19th Century, it was common in many varieties of English to pronounce "sea" so that it rhymed with "obey", and thus "Sayville" could have been a phonetic representation of how some speakers would have pronounced "Seaville."

Sayville became important mainly for its timber and oysters. Beginning in 1868, when the South Side Railroad arrived, the hamlet became a summer tourist destination. Over 30 hotels were built in the area, which hosts a ferry to Fire Island. Between 1880 and 1930, many grand homes and estates were built in Sayville, including Meadow Croft, the home of John Ellis Roosevelt, a cousin of Theodore Roosevelt. Meadow Croft still stands and is part of Suffolk County's San Souci Lakes Nature Preserve.

In 1912 a German Telefunken wireless transmitter was built in Sayville (now West Sayville) to broadcast to Germany. In 1915 the transmitter allegedly relayed a message from the German embassy to "get Lucy", referring to the RMS Lusitania which was sunk on May 15. Whether the signals coming from the transmitter in Sayville authorized the attack or not, they caused concern for the US government, which dispatched Marines to ensure that encrypted messages were not sent. The station was seized by the government outright after war was declared in 1917. President Woodrow Wilson sent a contingent of Marines to seize the wireless station, making it the first hostile action taken by the United States against Germany during World War I.

From 1919 to 1932 Sayville was home to Father Divine, a controversial African American religious leader who claimed to be God. His religious movement, which came to be called the International Peace Mission movement, managed a commune-like house on 72 Macon Avenue, which was the first black-owned residence in Sayville. At that time Sayville was predominantly a seasonal resort, and Father Divine's followers made good livings as native house sitters. Because followers turned over all of their profits to Father Divine, he was able to build several expansions on the house. He even bought an expensive Cadillac when neighbors complained about his noisy Hudson automobile.

Father Divine's ostentation annoyed the middle-class residents. Excess traffic that Father Divine attracted made him unpopular even to businesses he patronized with large cash purchases. Following a June 1932 trial and prison sentence for disturbing the peace, Father Divine moved to Harlem, New York, claiming that Sayville was racist. However, the commune remained on Macon Avenue for many years. Father Divine occasionally preached in Sayville afterward, but the home was only an outpost of his movement, not its headquarters.

In 1994, California State University at Fresno designated Sayville the "friendliest town in America".

Sayville is the embarkation point for ferries to the Fire Island communities of Cherry Grove and Fire Island Pines, both popular vacation communities for LGBT New Yorkers, as well as to Sailors Haven,
which includes the Sunken Forest.
The Sayville train station is on the Montauk branch of the Long Island Rail Road and has connections to the ferries via taxi and van services.

Education
The Sayville School District consists of one high school, one middle school, and three elementary schools. The high school is located in West Sayville on Brook Street. The middle school is located on Johnson Avenue. The elementary schools are on Sunrise Drive, Lincoln Avenue, and Cherry Avenue, named after their respective streets. Lincoln and Sunrise Elementary Schools are both located in Sayville. Cherry Avenue Elementary School is located in West Sayville. Parts of Sayville attend Connetquot School District.

Library
The area is served by the Sayville Public Library, located at 88 Greene Ave (ZIP code 11782-2723)

Postal service
The area is served by the Sayville post office, located at 130 Greene Avenue (ZIP code 11782-2723).

Geography
The community borders the Great South Bay. Sayville is located at  (40.746282, -73.081112).

The hamlet is bordered by the bay to the south, Sunrise Highway to the north, Brown Creek to the east, and Greenes Creek to the west.

Sayville is also home to the Sayville National Wildlife Refuge, a 127-acre refuge operated by the U.S. Fish and Wildlife Service.

Emergency services

Sayville is covered by the Sayville Fire Department, a New York State-designated fire district. The Sayville Fire Department is the volunteer fire department agency employed by the Sayville Fire District to provide fire protection for this area. This agency responds to all fire-related emergencies and motor vehicle crashes with personal injury, as well as numerous other emergency incidents within the borders of the Sayville Fire District. The Sayville Fire Department is a certified New York State fire department.

Sayville receives emergency medical services from Community Ambulance Company Inc. This volunteer ambulance company responds to all medical emergencies within the Sayville, West Sayville, Bayport, Bohemia, and Oakdale area. They are a certified New York State Department of Health, Emergency Medical Service agency that provides Advanced Life Support (ALS) care.

Demographics

As of the census of 2000, there were 16,735 people, 5,603 households, and 4,353 families residing in the CDP. The population density was 3,028.4/mi2 (1,168.4/km2). There were 5,721 housing units at an average density of 1,035.3/mi2 (399.4/km2). The racial makeup of the CDP was 95.81% White, 0.72% African American, 0.04% Native American, 2.03% Asian, 0.48% from other races, and 0.92% from two or more races. Hispanic or Latino of any race were 3.02% of the population.

There were 5,603 households, out of which 40.3% had children under the age of 18 living with them, 65.2% were married couples living together, 9.5% had a female householder with no husband present, and 22.3% were non-families. 17.5% of all households were made up of individuals, and 8.0% had someone living alone who was 65 years of age or older. The average household size was 2.92 and the average family size was 3.34.

In the CDP, the population was spread out, with 27.2% under the age of 18, 6.2% from 18 to 24, 30.7% from 25 to 44, 24.1% from 45 to 64, and 11.8% who were 65 years of age or older. The median age was 37 years. For every 100 females, there were 92.6 males. For every 100 females age 18 and over, there were 88.9 males.

The median income for a household in the CDP was $75,236, and the median income for a family was $85,229. Males had a median income of $57,055 versus $35,091 for females. The per capita income for the CDP was $28,723. About 2.5% of families and 4.1% of the population were below the poverty line, including 3.6% of those under age 18 and 4.6% of those age 65 or over.

Notable people
Bessie Bonehill, English vaudeville performer
Marlon Brando, actor in such films as A Streetcar Named Desire and Apocalypse Now
Mike Buck, NFL quarterback
James Cantor, neuroscientist, sex researcher
Jack Coan, football quarterback for the Notre Dame Fighting Irish.
Louise Forsslund (1873–1910), author
Andrew Garbarino, politician and attorney; representative for New York's 2nd congressional district in the United States House of Representatives
Melissa Joan Hart, actress
Michael Jahn, Edgar Award-winning author
Shayana D. Kadidal, civil rights lawyer
Tom Westman, winner of Survivor: Palau and contestant of Survivor: Heroes vs. Villains

See also
Sayville Yacht Club
Sayville Congregational Church

References

External links

 Sayville.com, community website
 Sayville Post Office History
 Sayville Fire Department
 1873 map of Sayville
 1888 map of Sayville
 Sayville and West Sayville photographs

Islip (town), New York
Census-designated places in New York (state)
Hamlets in New York (state)
Census-designated places in Suffolk County, New York
Hamlets in Suffolk County, New York
Populated coastal places in New York (state)